José Castro (1808–1860) was a native governor of Alta California.

José Castro may also refer to:

José Ribeiro e Castro (born 1957), Portuguese politician
José Castro (baseball) (born 1958), professional baseball coach
José Castro (fencer) (born 1928), Portuguese Olympic fencer
José Castro (footballer) (born 2001), Chilean football player
José Castro (sport shooter) (born 1907), Brazilian Olympic shooter
José Castro (water polo) (born 1915), Uruguayan Olympic water polo player
José Antonio Castro (born 1980), Mexican football player
José Bañales Castro (born 1960), Mexican politician
José Alberto Castro (born 1963), Mexican producer and director
José de Castro (1868–1929), Portuguese lawyer, journalist and politician
José García Castro (1933–2003), known as Pepillo, Spanish football player
José Gregorio Castro (1859–1924), Peruvian prelate and former bishop of Cuzco
José María Castro Madriz, Costa Rican lawyer, academic, diplomat, and politician